F2F was a short lived youth chat show series which aired on the British television channel Granada Talk TV. It featured phone ins, studio guests and comedy sketches within interstitials. The series ran between October 1996 and August 1997, when the channel was officially closed. It was presented by both Sacha Baron Cohen and Natasha Kaplinsky in their first major roles on television.

External links
 

1996 British television series debuts
1997 British television series endings
1990s British television talk shows
British television talk shows
English-language television shows